This list of newspapers in Israel is a list of newspapers printed and distributed in the State of Israel. Most are published in Hebrew, but there are also newspapers catering to Arabic speakers, and newspapers catering to immigrants speaking a variety of other languages, such as Russian, English and French.

In 2022, a TGI survey indicated that Israel Hayom, distributed for free, is Israel's most read newspaper, with a 31% weekday readership exposure, followed by Yedioth Ahronoth, with 23.9%, Haaretz with 4.7%, and Maariv with 3.5%.

National newspapers

Readership 

The following are the Israeli newspapers exposure rates according to the Target Group Index (TGI), with surveys from 2016, 2019 and 2020.

Local newspapers 
Jerusalem
Kol Ha'ir
Tel Aviv
Ha'ir
Zman Tel Aviv

Defunct newspapers 

Party–affiliated
During the Mandate era and the first decades following independence, there were numerous newspapers owned and associated with political parties. They had mostly been discontinued by the 1970s, though a few remain, including Hamodia (Agudat Yisrael), al-Ittihad (Maki) and Yated Ne'eman (Degel HaTorah).

HaZvi (1884–1914, Hebrew) published by Eliezer Ben-Yehuda
Ha'or (1908–?, Hebrew), name change of HaZvi, banned by the Ottoman government.
Al HaMishmar (1943–1995, Hebrew), associated with Hashomer Hatzair
Davar (1925–1996, Hebrew), associated with the Histadrut
Die Woch (1959–?, Yiddish), associated with Mapai
HaBoker (1934–1965, Hebrew), associated with the General Zionists
HaMashkif (1938–1948, Hebrew), associated with Hatzohar
HaTzofe (1937–2008, Hebrew), associated with the National Religious Party
Hazit HaAm (1931–1934, Hebrew), associated with Hatzohar
Herut (1948–1965, Hebrew), associated with Herut
Israel Shtime (1956–1997, Yiddish), associated with Mapam
Kol HaAm (1937–1975, Hebrew), associated with Maki
LaMerhav (1954–1971, Hebrew), associated with Ahdut HaAvoda
Walka (1958–1965, Polish), associated with Maki
Independent
Hadashot (1984–1993, Hebrew)
Israel-Nachrichten (1935–2011, German)
Israel Post (2007-2016, Hebrew) 
Israeli (2006–2008, Hebrew)
Új Kelet (1948–2015, Hungarian)
Vesti (1992–2018, Russian)

See also 

Newspapers of Israel
List of Jewish newspapers
Media of Israel

References

External links 

The Printed Media at the Israel Ministry of Foreign Affairs website

 
Newspapers
Israel